Roselda Joux (born 31 March 1950 in Aosta) is an Italian former alpine skier who competed several years in the FIS World Cup, earning as her career best result a 5th place in a slalom race held at Abetone in 1968.

Her daughter Sonia Viérin (born 1977) and her granddaughter Sophie Mathiou (born 2002) are world-class Alpine skiers as well.

References

External links
 

1950 births
Living people
Italian female alpine skiers
People from Aosta
Sportspeople from Aosta Valley